The wushu competition at the 2019 Southeast Asian Games in the Philippines was held at the World Trade Center in Pasay, Metro Manila from December 1 to 3, 2019.

Participating nations
A total of 72 athletes from 9 nations participated (the numbers of athletes are shown in parentheses).

Medal summary

Medal table

Men's taolu

Women's taolu

Men's sanda

Women's sanda

References

External links
 

2019
Southeast Asian Games
2019 Southeast Asian Games events